Anarak-e Olya (also Romanized as Anārak-e ‘Olyā; also known as Anārak and Anārak-e Sevvom) is a village in Osmanvand Rural District, Firuzabad District, Kermanshah County, Kermanshah Province, Iran. At the 2006 census, its population was 101, in 23 families.

References 

Populated places in Kermanshah County